Don't Feed the Monster is the tenth studio album by American rapper Homeboy Sandman. It was released on October 16, 2020, through Mello Music Group with distribution via The Orchard. Production was handled entirely by Quelle Chris, who is featured on the album as well.

Music videos 
The Pavel Buryak-directed music video for the song "Monument" won UK Music Video Award for Best Hip Hop/Grime/Rap Video at the 2021 UK Music Video Awards. The music video for "Don't Look Down", directed by Robert Mayer a.k.a. Photo Rob, won Best Foreign Documentary at the 2022 Rome Film Awards.

Critical reception 

Don't Feed the Monster was listed in NPR's top 50 albums of 2020. AllMusic selected the project in their Best Rap & Hip-Hop Albums of 2020 and rating the album 4 out of 5 stars. Don't Feed the Monster received critical praise from Patrick Taylor of RapReviews hailing it, "yet another solid Homeboy Sandman release and a fitting album for 2020".

Track listing

Personnel 
 Angel Del Villar II – rap vocals, executive producer
 Gavin Christopher Tennille – rap vocals (track 4), producer, executive producer
 Alejandro "Sosa" Tello Jr. – mixing, mastering
 Michael Tolle – executive producer
 Robert P. Cohen – cover photo
 Mitch Lagrow – designer

References

External links 
 
 Don't Feed The Monster at Bandcamp

2020 albums
Homeboy Sandman albums
Mello Music Group albums
Albums produced by Quelle Chris